Burswood is an inner southeastern suburb of Perth, Western Australia, located immediately across the Swan River from Perth's central business district (CBD). Its local government area is the Town of Victoria Park. Burswood is the location of the State Tennis Centre, Perth Stadium, Belmont Park Racecourse, and the Crown Perth casino and hotel complex.

History
Burswood developed as two separate entities Burswood Island, and a southernmost part within the suburb of Victoria Park until the 1990s.

Henry Camfield, who emigrated from England to the Swan River Colony in 1829, with two indentured servants and their families, was granted  of land opposite Claisebrook. Camfield named the estate after his father's farm, Burrswood, near Groombridge in Kent.

The area was a low-lying peninsula leading to a ridge and steep, sandy hill with scrubland beyond. The peninsula became Burrswood Island in 1841 when Burswood canal was cut to offer a more direct route to Guildford, which had previously been encumbered by mud flats. By this time, the land was earning income and Camfield let it to tenants until he sold it in 1871 when he was living at Camfield House. A statue of Henry Camfield is located in Burswood Park surrounding the entertainment complex today.

During the 1890s, the Bunbury Bridge and the Perth to Armadale railway line were built in the area. The current spelling of Burswood was a result of a misspelling on the station signage. Western Australia's first golf course (9-hole) was built at Burswood Island in 1895 the clubhouse was a mud hut and in 1899 a racecourse was also built. This was built by Albert Edmund Cockram and in 1902 it became the Belmont Park Racecourse. In 1906 Goodwood railway station, later renamed Belmont Park, opened.

From 1900 until 1943 there were two racecourses, Goodwood and Belmont Park. These were owned by Albert Edmund Cockram as was Burswood Island. He developed the racecourses and became the largest importer of thoroughbreds into Australia. The  Western Australian Turf Club took over both in 1945 purchasing it from the estate of Albert Edmund Cockram and closed Goodwood.

Efforts were made to establish a residential district at "Riversdale Estate", but the use of Burswood Island as part of a sewerage filtration system (1906-1934) and the existence of various light industries from the 1910s onward worked against development. Residents in the area requested a change of name and in 1921, the name Rivervale was adopted.

In 1985, the development of the Burswood Island Resort, including a casino, rehabilitated the name and the suburb was gazetted as Burswood in 1993, also including the residential area of Victoria Park south of Burswood Road.

Population
In the 2016 Census, there were 2,340 people in Burswood. 42.0% of people were born in Australia. The next most common country of birth was England at 6.8%. 56.8% of people spoke only English at home. Other languages spoken at home included Mandarin at 5.7%. The most common responses for religion were No Religion 31.5% and Catholic 22.2%.

Notably 8.8% of Burswood's population has Chinese ancestry, well above the state or national averages.

Geography

Burswood is bounded by the Swan River to the west, north and north-east; Graham Farmer Freeway, Great Eastern Highway and the Armadale railway to the east, and Shepperton Road and Harper Street to the south.

Facilities

Burswood includes Belmont Park Racecourse, Perth's winter thoroughbred racing track; Perth Stadium, a 60,000 seat multi-purpose venue for all football codes, cricket and entertainment events; the State Tennis Centre; and Crown Perth (formerly the Burswood Entertainment Complex), with three hotels, a casino, a convention and function centre, a theatre and many restaurants and bars.

Burswood was the site of Western Australia's first and oldest golf course, established in 1895 and closed in 2013 amid controversy, to make way for construction of Perth Stadium and a new hotel. The Burswood Superdome, a 13,600 seat multipurpose indoor arena used for sports and entertainment, operated from 1998 to 2012. It was demolished in 2013, to be replaced by a casino carpark.

Transport
The Perth-Armadale rail line runs through the area and is serviced by Burswood railway station. Buses from the Victoria Park transfer station along Great Eastern Highway and Craig Street service the area. Perth Stadium is serviced on event days by the Perth Stadium bus station and the Perth Stadium railway station, with some train services stopping on weekends. All services are operated by the Public Transport Authority.

Politics
The nearest polling booth, Homestead Seniors Centre in Victoria Park, is marginal at federal level, and supports the Australian Labor Party at state elections.

References

 
Suburbs of Perth, Western Australia
Suburbs in the Town of Victoria Park